Wong Shik Ling (also known as S. L. Wong) published a scheme of phonetic symbols for Cantonese based on the International Phonetic Alphabet (IPA) in the book A Chinese Syllabary Pronounced According to the Dialect of Canton.  The scheme has been widely used in Chinese dictionaries published in Hong Kong.  The scheme, known as S. L. Wong system, is a broad phonemic transcription system based on IPA and its analysis of Cantonese phonemes is grounded in the theories of Y. R. Chao.

Other than the phonemic transcription system, Wong also derived a romanisation scheme published in the same book.  See S. L. Wong (romanisation).

History
Before devising the system, Wong studied many phonetic transcription and romanisation systems, including Eitel's and other earlier schemes, for Cantonese. He found that many of them were not accurate enough for use.  He researched Cantonese and published his results in the book in 1938.

Use
The system, with minor variations, has been adopted by some other Hong Kong Chinese dictionaries including 中文字典, Chinese Dictionary by 喬硯農 (Kiu Yin Nung), 中華新字典, Chung Hwa New Dictionary and 商務新字典, Commercial Press New Dictionary. Hong Kong Education and Manpower Bureau formulates Cantonese Pinyin romanisations based on the system.

In Chinese phonological studies, other systems more phonetic in character are collectively referred to as the narrow transcription (i.e., phonetic transcription) even though they are not necessarily exact phonetic transcription systems. The various narrow transcriptions by different scholars are not identical due to the scholars' differing analyses of the Cantonese phonemes (for example, the  phoneme might be analyzed as ).

For convenience purposes, in the rest of this article, when the broad system is mentioned, it refers to S. L. Wong's system; when narrow is mentioned, it refers to a representative narrow system but does not imply that all narrow systems are as described.

Phonology
Cantonese, like other varieties of Chinese, is monosyllabic.  Each syllable is divided into an initial (consonant), final (vowel and following consonant) and tone.

Finals
Chinese phonology traditionally stresses finals because they are related to rhymes in the composition of poems, proses and articles.  There are 53 finals in Cantonese.

The long vowel symbol "" can also be omitted since these allophonic long and short vowels have different points of articulation in modern Cantonese.

Vowels

When adopting a phonetic transcription for vowels, the symbol  is often replaced by the symbol .

Falling diphthong finals
All vowel phonemes except  form 9 finals themselves.

Nasal phoneme finals 

Plosive phoneme finals 

Syllabic nasal finals

Summary
Here are the 53 finals in a table:

 Character example with initial. No character with exact pronunciation.
 Character example with initial . In the absence of an initial,  pronounced with  becomes ,  becomes ,  becomes ,  becomes , and so forth.
  Character example with initial . In the absence of an initial,  pronounced with  becomes ,  becomes ,  becomes ,  becomes }.
  Character example with initial . In the absence of an initial,  pronounced with  becomes ,  becomes ,  becomes .

Initials
Initials are made up of consonants.  Most characters are preceding finals with initials while some characters are pronounced without initials.  There are 19 initials in total.

Unlike English, Cantonese has no voiced-voiceless contrast.  Instead, aspirated-unaspirated contrast plays an important role in distinguishing meanings.  Since there are no voiced plosive and affricative consonants in Cantonese, the scheme makes use of these unused voiced symbols for unaspirated.

In modern Cantonese, all non-nasal initial consonants are voiceless. However, there are many contrasting aspirated and unaspirated pairs of such initial consonants. The S. L. Wong system uses  in the broad transcription to represent the phoneme written  (also written , "devoiced b") in narrow transcriptions, and uses  in the broad system to represent the phoneme written  in the narrow system.

Single articulation

Coarticulation

Affricates

Summary

They are not used for transcription.

Tones
There are basically six tones in Cantonese.  Tones play an important role in distinguishing meanings.  Tones also form melodies in poem and prose composition.

In classical Chinese, four basic tones are the level (平 ˌp‘iŋ),  the rising (上 ˏsœŋ), the going  (去 ˉhœy) and the entering (入 ˍjɐp).  The entering tone is a special case for when a syllable ends with [p], [t], or [k]; those syllables have a shorter quality than others.

The tones are further divided into upper and lower level, i.e. the rising and going tones.  The entering tone is divided into upper entering, middle entering and lower entering. The upper entering is the same tone as upper level, middle entering the same as upper going, and lower entering the same as lower going.

There are two ways to mark tones in the scheme, appending a number to the end of the syllable or using diacritical marks.  Each tone's corresponding contour based on Yuen Ren Chao scheme in later studies is given in the second line of its table entry.

While the system uses 1 to 9 as tone numbers, some adaptations use a 1 to 6 system, i.e. replacing redundant 7, 8, 9 with 1, 3, 6 respectively.

Some dictionaries use slightly different tone symbols. For example, in – ' − – –dzi –, a superscript + is used to represent the tone contour 55, and the symbol √ replaces the original tone symbol / "to improve legibility".

Examples
Here the syllable fan illustrates the basic tones, and sik the checked (entering) tones.

See also
S. L. Wong (romanisation)

References

External links
The Chinese University of Hong Kong Research Centre for Humanities Computing: Chinese Character Database: With Word-formations Phonologically Disambiguated According to the Cantonese Dialect
粵語拼盤: Learning the phonetic system of Cantonese
Cukda Cantonese IME

Cantonese language
Cantonese romanisation